Yantang is a town in the northeast of Guangxi, China, located not far from the border with Hunan province. It is under the administration of Zhongshan County.

Towns of Hezhou